The 1960–61 NHL season was the 44th season of the National Hockey League. The Chicago Black Hawks defeated the Detroit Red Wings in the Stanley Cup Finals four games to two to win the Stanley Cup. It was the first series since  with two American-based teams. It was Chicago's first Cup win since ; they would not win another until .

Red Wings' forward Gordie Howe became the first player in NHL history to score 1,000 regular-season points. It took seven more seasons before the Montreal Canadiens' Jean Beliveau would match the feat.

League business
The original Hart Trophy was retired, as all its plaques were filled and its general condition had deteriorated. A new trophy was commissioned and the award was renamed the Hart Memorial Trophy.

Off-season
On September 15, 1960, Maurice "Rocket" Richard announced his retirement from hockey. During his career, he had led all scorers with a record 544 goals plus an additional 82 goals in the playoffs. Despite the league expanding the number of games in a season to 70 games from 50 since Richard's famous 50 goals in 50 games, Richard remained the only player to score 50 goals in a season, until this season.

Regular season

By this season, the Chicago Black Hawks were a strong team. They had an especially powerful defence, which had Pierre Pilote, Al Arbour, Jack Evans, and Elmer Vasko. Up front, youngsters Bobby Hull and Stan Mikita led the offense, and goaltender Glenn Hall was the Hawks' steady presence between the pipes.

It was reported that Eddie Shore, the great Boston Bruins defenceman and four-time league MVP from the 1930s, had been stricken with a heart attack, but was resting comfortably in a Springfield, Massachusetts hospital.

On October 13, the Canadiens routed the Rangers 8–4, with Bernie Geoffrion and Dickie Moore each scoring hat tricks.

Jack McCartan got his only NHL shutout for the New York Rangers by blanking the Black Hawks 2–0 on October 19. Chicago's Reg Fleming set a record with 37 penalty minutes in this game. They included three major penalties for battles with Dean Prentice, Eddie Shack, and John Hanna, a misconduct, and a game misconduct.

On December 1, the Canadiens, who had traded André Pronovost to Boston for Jean-Guy Gendron, defeated the Toronto Maple Leafs 6–3 at the Montreal Forum. Gendron had a goal, but the main feature was the 21 penalties referee Frank Udvari had to call, including several majors in the third period. Henri Richard took on Frank Mahovlich, Dickie Moore squared off with Bob Pulford, and Marcel Bonin scrapped with Bobby Baun. Toronto general manager and head coach George "Punch" Imlach was in a bad mood following the game and said to the press among other things that Udvari and linesmen Loring Doolittle and George Hayes should have been picked as the three stars for the help they gave to Montreal. Imlach's comments were brought to the attention of NHL president Clarence Campbell, who fined the Leafs bench boss $200.

In the new year, Stan Mikita helped to spark Chicago. He scored two goals in a 3–2 win over the Rangers on January 4 and scored the winner when the Black Hawks beat Boston 4–3 the following night.

Former Canadiens defenceman Leo Lamoureux died in Indianapolis on January 11 at age 45.

Chicago defeated the Rangers 4–3 on March 8. New York goalie Gump Worsley pulled a hamstring muscle and Joe Shaefer replaced him with the score 1–1. The next night, the Rangers were eliminated from the playoffs as Bernie Geoffrion potted a hat trick in a 6–1 pasting by the Canadiens.

Toronto's Johnny Bower, who appeared on his way to winning the Vezina Trophy, strained a leg muscle and would have to take a rest. Cesare Maniago played in goal for the Leafs on March 16 and lost 5–2. It looked like two players, Toronto's Frank Mahovlich and Montreal's Bernie "Boom Boom" Geoffrion, were going to hit 50 goals, but Mahovlich ended up slumping near the end of the season and missed 50 by two goals. Geoffrion scored his 50th goal that night and got a wild ovation. He also added 45 assists and led the league in scoring.

Toronto played a 2–2 tie with the Rangers in their final game of the season and Bobby Baun was a victim of his own hard-hitting. Camille Henry of the Rangers ran into Baun and Henry's skate cut Baun in the neck. Baun returned for the third period, but after the game, while boarding the team bus, he began to gasp desperately. He groped for attention and waved his arms, and his teammates finally realized he was in trouble and rushed him to the hospital where an emergency operation was performed to permit breathing. Baun missed some action in the playoffs as the result of the injury.

Final standings

Playoffs
For the Montreal Canadiens, their defeat to eventual Stanley Cup champion Chicago Black Hawks in the first round ended two streaks (ten consecutive Finals appearances and five consecutive Stanley Cup wins). The Detroit Red Wings defeated the Toronto Maple Leafs in the other semifinal to set up an all-American final between Chicago and Detroit.

Playoff bracket

Semifinals

(1) Montreal Canadiens vs. (3) Chicago Black Hawks

(2) Toronto Maple Leafs vs. (4) Detroit Red Wings

Stanley Cup Finals

Chicago defeated the Red Wings in six games to win their first Cup since 1938, and their last until 2010.

Awards

All-Star teams

Player statistics

Scoring leaders
Note: GP = Games played, G = Goals, A = Assists, Pts = Points, PIM = Penalties in minutes

Leading goaltenders

Note: GP = Games played; Min = Minutes played; GA = Goals against; GAA = Goals against average; W = Wins; L = Losses; T = Ties; SO = Shutouts

Coaches
Boston Bruins: Milt Schmidt
Chicago Black Hawks: Rudy Pilous
Detroit Red Wings: Sid Abel
Montreal Canadiens: Toe Blake
New York Rangers: Alfred Pike
Toronto Maple Leafs: Punch Imlach

Debuts
The following is a list of players of note who played their first NHL game in 1960–61 (listed with their first team, asterisk(*) marks debut in playoffs):
Ted Green, Boston Bruins
Chico Maki*, Chicago Black Hawks
Bobby Rousseau, Montreal Canadiens
Gilles Tremblay, Montreal Canadiens
Rod Gilbert, New York Rangers
Jean Ratelle, New York Rangers
Cesare Maniago, Toronto Maple Leafs
Dave Keon, Toronto Maple Leafs

Last games
The following is a list of players of note that played their last game in the NHL in 1960–61 (listed with their last team):
Willie O'Ree, Boston Bruins (First black player in the NHL)
Fern Flaman, Boston Bruins
Tod Sloan, Chicago Black Hawks
Red Sullivan, New York Rangers
Larry Regan, Toronto Maple Leafs

See also 
 1960-61 NHL transactions
 List of Stanley Cup champions
 14th National Hockey League All-Star Game
 National Hockey League All-Star Game
 1960 in sports
 1961 in sports

References

 
 
 

 

 

 
Notes

External links
Hockey Database
NHL.com

 
1960–61 in American ice hockey by league
1960–61 in Canadian ice hockey by league